Byun Kyung-soo (born 13 April 1958) is a South Korean sport shooter who competed in the 1988 Summer Olympics.

References

1958 births
Living people
South Korean male sport shooters
Trap and double trap shooters
Olympic shooters of South Korea
Shooters at the 1988 Summer Olympics
Shooters at the 1986 Asian Games
Shooters at the 1990 Asian Games
Shooters at the 2002 Asian Games
Asian Games medalists in shooting
Place of birth missing (living people)
Asian Games gold medalists for South Korea
Asian Games silver medalists for South Korea
Medalists at the 1986 Asian Games
20th-century South Korean people
21st-century South Korean people